Francis Wayland III (August 23, 1826 – January 9, 1904) was an American lawyer and politician who served as the and first dean of Yale Law School and 54th lieutenant governor of Connecticut.

Early life and education 
Wayland was born in Boston, the son of Francis Wayland. He earned a Bachelor of Arts degree from Brown University in 1846 and studied law at Harvard Law School.

Career 
Wayland became probate judge in Connecticut in 1864 and was the 54th lieutenant governor of Connecticut in 1869–1870. In 1872, he became a professor in the Yale Law School, of which he was dean from 1873 to 1903.

References

1826 births
1904 deaths
Lieutenant Governors of Connecticut
Phillips Academy alumni
Connecticut state court judges
Brown University alumni
Harvard Law School alumni
Yale Law School faculty
Deans of Yale Law School
American legal scholars
19th-century American judges